The Lenoir Store built in 1869 is an historic general store building located in the High Hills of Santee community of Horatio, South Carolina. It stands on the same site where the Lenoir family has operated a general store since before 1808 and "is the oldest business establishment in Sumter County". Since 1900 it has served as the post office for Horatio Zip Code 29062. On July 3, 1997, it was added to the National Register of Historic Places. As of that date, it was still being operated by members of the Lenoir family. Lenoir is pronounced le-nore or len-wa by some of its more northern members.

See also
List of Registered Historic Places in South Carolina

References

External links 
 Names in Sumter District

Commercial buildings on the National Register of Historic Places in South Carolina
Buildings and structures in Sumter County, South Carolina
High Hills of Santee
Commercial buildings completed in 1878
National Register of Historic Places in Sumter County, South Carolina